The Poland women's national handball team is controlled by the Poland Handball Federation (Związek Piłki Ręcznej w Polsce), and represents Poland in international matches.

Results

World Championship
 1957 – 7th place
 1962 – 7th place
 1965 – 8th place
 1973 – 5th place
 1975 – 7th place
 1978 – 6th place
 1986 – 13th place
 1990 – 9th place
 1993 – 10th place
 1997 – 8th place
 1999 – 11th place
 2005 – 19th place
 2007 – 11th place
 2013 – 4th place
 2015 – 4th place
 2017 – 17th place
 2021 – 15th place

European Championship
 1996 – 11th place
 1998 – 5th place
 2006 – 8th place
 2014 – 11th place
 2016 – 15th place
 2018 – 14th place
 2020 – 14th place
 2022 – 13th place

Performance in other tournaments
 Carpathian Trophy 1984 – Third place
 Carpathian Trophy 1985 – Second place
 Carpathian Trophy 1988 – Second place
 GF World Cup 2006 – Seventh place
 Carpathian Trophy 2010 – Second place
 Carpathian Trophy 2017 – Winner

Team

Current squad
Squad for the 2022 European Women's Handball Championship.

Head coach: Arne Senstad

Coaches
 Antoni Szymański (1951–1953)
 Tadeusz Breguła (1953–1956)
 Władysław Stawiarski (1956–1959)
 Edward Surdyka (1960–1965)
 Józef Zając (1966–1969)
 Paweł Wiśniowski (1969–1971)
 Leon Nosila (1971–1973)
 Zygmunt Jakubik (1973–1977)
 Mieczysław Kiegiel (1977–1979)
 Tadeusz Wadych (1980–1982)
 Bogdan Cybulski (1982–1986)
 Jerzy Noszczak (1987–1994)
 Jerzy Ciepliński (1994–2000)
 Marek Karpiński (2000–2003)
 Zygfryd Kuchta (2003–2006)
 Jerzy Ciepliński (2006)
 Zenon Łakomy (2006–2008)
 Krzysztof Przybylski (2008–2010)
 Kim Rasmussen (2010–2016)
 Leszek Krowicki (2016–2019)
 Arne Senstad (2019–)

References

External links

IHF profile

National team
Women's national handball teams
handball